Lukov (German: Dornau) is a village and municipality in Bardejov District in the Prešov Region of north-east Slovakia.

History
In historical records the village was first mentioned in 1264 The timber Church of Saints Cosmo and Damian was built in 1708.

Geography
The municipality lies at an altitude of 420 meters (1380 feet) and covers an area of 28.6 km2 (11 miles2).
It has a population of about 570 people.

References

External links 
 
 

Villages and municipalities in Bardejov District
Šariš